The Oubangui mouse (Mus oubanguii) is a species of rodent in the family Muridae.
It is found only in the Central African Republic.
Its natural habitat is dry savanna.

References

Mus (rodent)
Endemic fauna of the Central African Republic
Mammals described in 1970
Taxonomy articles created by Polbot